Gordeyev or Gordeev (feminine: Gordeyeva / Gordeeva) is a Russian-language patronymic surname derived from the given name  , a variant of   Gordianus/ Gordian. Notable people with this surname include:

Alexey Gordeyev
Andrei Gordeyev
Artyom Gordeyev (disambiguation), multiple people
Artyom Gordeyev (ice hockey)
Ekaterina Gordeeva, Russian figure skater
Fyodor Gordeyev (1744-1810), Russian sculptor
Irina Gordeeva, Russian high jumper
Katerina Gordeeva (born 1977), Russian journalist
Sergei Gordeev, Russian billionaire property developer
Tatyana Gordeyeva, Russian heptathlete
Valery Gordeev (born 1952), Soviet motorcycle speedway rider
Vladimir Gordeev (born 1950), Soviet motorcycle speedway rider
Yulia Gordeeva (born 1988), Russian footballer

See also
Foma Gordeyev, a novel
Foma Gordeyev (film)

 Patronymic surnames
 Russian-language surnames